The city of Satu Mare is divided into 12 districts:
 14 Mai
 Carpați I
 Carpați II
 Centru Nou
 Cloșca
 Crișan
 Micro 17
 Horea
 Menumorut
 Sătmărel
 Soarelui
 Solidarității

References

Districts of Satu Mare